In probability theory and statistics, the negative multinomial distribution is a generalization of the negative binomial distribution (NB(x0, p)) to more than two outcomes.

As with the univariate negative binomial distribution, if the parameter  is a positive integer, the negative multinomial distribution has an urn model interpretation. Suppose we have an experiment that generates m+1≥2 possible outcomes, {X0,...,Xm}, each occurring with non-negative probabilities {p0,...,pm} respectively. If sampling proceeded until n observations were made, then {X0,...,Xm} would have been multinomially distributed. However, if the experiment is stopped once X0 reaches the predetermined value x0 (assuming x0 is a positive integer), then the distribution of the m-tuple {X1,...,Xm} is negative multinomial.  These variables are not multinomially distributed because their sum X1+...+Xm is not fixed, being a draw from a negative binomial distribution.

Properties

Marginal distributions

If m-dimensional x is partitioned as follows

and accordingly   

and let

That is the marginal distribution is also negative multinomial with the   removed and the remaining p'''s properly scaled so as to add to one.

The univariate marginal  is said to have a negative binomial distribution.

Conditional distributions

That is,

Independent sums
If  and If  are independent, then
. Similarly and conversely, it is easy to see from the characteristic function that the negative multinomial is infinitely divisible.

Aggregation
If

then, if the random variables with subscripts i and j'' are dropped from the vector and replaced by their sum,

This aggregation property may be used to derive the marginal distribution of  mentioned above.

Correlation matrix
The entries of the correlation matrix are

Parameter estimation

Method of Moments

If we let the mean vector of the negative multinomial be

and covariance matrix

then it is easy to show through properties of determinants that . From this, it can be shown that

and

Substituting sample moments yields the method of moments estimates

and

Related distributions
 Negative binomial distribution
 Multinomial distribution
 Inverted Dirichlet distribution, a conjugate prior for the negative multinomial
 Dirichlet negative multinomial distribution

References

Waller LA and Zelterman D. (1997). Log-linear modeling with the negative multi-
nomial distribution. Biometrics 53: 971–82.

Further reading

Factorial and binomial topics
Multivariate discrete distributions